Omid Abolhassani (born September 20, 1988) is an Iranian football player. He was banned from any sports activity for four years, due to his  use of forbidden substance higenamine. He currently plays for the Azadegan League club Giti Pasand as a striker.

Doping; four-year ban 
Omid Abolhasani was banned from any sports activity for four years, due to his use of forbidden substance higenamine.

Club career
A product of the Zob Ahan 's youth system, Rasouli was drafted into the first team for the IPL 2007/08 season.

Club career

Assists

References

External links
Profile at persianleague.com

Iranian footballers
Pas players
1988 births
Living people
Zob Ahan Esfahan F.C. players
Giti Pasand players
Iranian sportspeople in doping cases
Association football forwards